The Kenyan Ambassador in Beijing is the official representative of the Government in Nairobi to the Government of the People's Republic of China.

List of representatives

Chinese Ambassador to Kenya

References 

 
China
Kenya